This is a list of schools in the Metropolitan Borough of Stockport in the English county of Greater Manchester.

State-funded schools

Primary schools 

Abingdon Primary School, Reddish
Adswood Primary School, Adswood
Alexandra Park Primary School, Edgeley
All Saints CE Primary School, Heaton Norris
All Saints CE Primary School, Marple
Arden Primary School, Bredbury
Banks Lane Infant School, Offerton
Banks Lane Junior School, Offerton
Bolshaw Primary School, Heald Green
Bradshaw Hall Primary School, Cheadle Hulme
Bredbury Green Primary School, Romiley
Bredbury St Marks CE Primary School, Bredbury
Bridge Hall Primary School, Adswood
Broadstone Hall Primary School, Heaton Chapel
Brookside Primary School, High Lane
Cale Green Primary School, Shaw Heath
Cheadle RC Infant School, Cheadle Hulme
Cheadle RC Junior School, Cheadle Hulme
Cheadle Heath Primary School, Cheadle Heath
Cheadle Hulme Primary School, Cheadle Hulme
Cheadle Primary School, Cheadle
Dial Park Primary School, Offerton
Didsbury Road Primary School, Heaton Mersey
Etchells Primary School, Heald Green
Fairway Primary School, Offerton
Gatley Primary School, Gatley
Great Moor Infant School, Great Moor
Great Moor Junior School, Great Moor
Greave Primary School, Woodley
Hazel Grove Primary School, Hazel Grove
High Lane Primary School, High Lane
Hursthead Infant School, Cheadle Hulme
Hursthead Junior School, Cheadle Hulme
Ladybridge Primary School, Cheadle
Ladybrook Primary School, Bramhall
Lane End Primary School, Cheadle Hulme
Lark Hill Primary School, Edgeley
Ludworth Primary School, Marple Bridge
Lum Head Primary School, Gatley
Meadowbank Primary School, Cheadle
Mellor Primary School, Mellor
Mersey Vale Primary School, Heaton Mersey
Moorfield Primary School, Hazel Grove
Moss Hey Primary School, Bramhall
Nevill Road Infant School, Bramhall
Nevill Road Junior School, Bramhall
Norbury Hall Primary School, Hazel Grove
Norris Bank Primary School, Heaton Norris
North Cheshire Jewish Primary School, Heald Green
Oak Tree Primary School, Cheadle Hulme
Our Lady's RC Primary School, Edgeley
Outwood Primary School, Heald Green
Pownall Green Primary School, Bramhall
Prospect Vale Primary School, Heald Green
Queensgate Primary School, Bramhall
Romiley Primary School, Romiley
Rose Hill Primary School, Marple
St Ambrose RC Primary School, Adswood
St Bernadette's RC Primary School, Brinnington
St Christopher's RC Primary School, Romiley
St Elisabeth's CE Primary School, Reddish
St George's CE Primary School, Heaviley
St John's CE Primary School, Heaton Mersey
St Joseph's RC Primary School, Reddish
St Joseph's RC Primary School, Stockport
St Mary's CE Primary School, South Reddish
St Mary's RC Academy, Marple Bridge
St Mary's RC Primary School, Heaton Norris
St Matthew's CE Primary School, Edgeley
St Paul's CE Primary School, Brinnington
St Peter's RC Primary School, Hazel Grove
St Philip's RC Primary School, Offerton
St Simon's RC Primary School, Hazel Grove
St Thomas' CE Primary School, Heaton Chapel
St Thomas' CE Primary School, Stockport
St Winifred's RC Primary School, Heaton Mersey
Thorn Grove Primary School, Cheadle Hulme
Tithe Barn Primary School, Heaton Mersey
Torkington Primary School, Hazel Grove
Vale View Primary School, North Reddish
Vernon Park Primary School, Stockport
Warren Wood Primary School, Offerton
Westmorland Primary School, Brinnington
Whitehill Primary School, Heaton Norris
Woodford Primary School, Woodford
Woodley Primary School, Woodley

Secondary schools 

Bramhall High School, Bramhall
Cheadle Hulme High School, Cheadle Hulme
Harrytown Catholic High School, Romiley
Hazel Grove High School, Hazel Grove
The Kingsway School, Cheadle
Laurus Cheadle Hulme, Cheadle Hulme
Marple Hall School, Marple
Priestnall School, Heaton Mersey
Reddish Vale High School, Reddish
St Anne's RC Voluntary Academy, Heaton Chapel
St James' RC High School, Cheadle Hulme
Stockport Academy, Cheadle Heath
Stockport School, Heaviley
Werneth School, Romiley

Special and alternative schools 

Castle Hill High School, Offerton
Heaton School, Heaton Moor
Highfields Inclusion Partnership, Brinnington
Lisburne School, Offerton
Moat House, Heaton Norris
Oakgrove School, Heald Green
The Pendlebury Centre, Cheadle Heath
Valley School, Bramhall
Windlehurst School, Marple

Further education 
Aquinas College, Heaviley
Marple Sixth Form College, Marple
Stockport College, Stockport
The Cheadle College, Cheadle Hulme

Independent schools

Primary and preparatory schools
Brabyns Preparatory School, Marple
Greenbank School, Cheadle Hulme
Lady Barn House School, Cheadle
Stella Maris School, Heaton Mersey

Senior and all-through schools
Cheadle Hulme School, Cheadle Hulme
Covenant Christian School, Heaton Moor
Hulme Hall Grammar School, Shaw Heath
Stockport Grammar School, Heaviley

Special and alternative schools 

Acorns School, Marple
Ashcroft School, Cheadle
Bridge House School, Bredbury
Broadstones School, Reddish
Inscape House School, Cheadle
North West Priory School, Cheadle
Penarth Group School, Hazel Grove
Progress Schools, Stockport
Reddish Hall School, Reddish
Royal School Manchester, Cheadle Hulme
Willow House, Cheadle

References

 Stockport Council School and Centre Finder

 
Stockport